Estey is a surname of English origin. Notable people with the surname include:

Mary Estey (1634-1692), early American puritan hanged in the Salem witch trials
Jacob Estey (1814–1890), American founder of Estey Organ
James Wilfred Estey (1889–1956), Canadian puisne justice of the Supreme Court of Canada
Audrée Estey (1910-2002), American founder of the American Repertory Ballet
Willard Estey (1919-2002), Canadian puisne justice of the Supreme Court of Canada, and son of James Estey
John Estey, American Chief of Staff to Pennsylvania Governor Ed Rendell from 2003 until 2007

References